Murder by Television (1935) is an American mystery film starring Bela Lugosi, June Collyer, and Huntley Gordon. The film is also known as The Houghland Murder Case. The cast also includes Hattie McDaniel.

Plot
James Houghland (Mailes), inventor of a new method by which television signals can be instantaneously sent anywhere in the world, refuses to sell the process to television companies, who then send agents to acquire the invention any way they can.

On the night of his initial broadcast Houghland is mysteriously murdered in the middle of his demonstration and it falls to Police Chief Nelson (Mowbray) to determine who the murderer is from the many suspects present.

Cast
Bela Lugosi 	... 	dual role as Dr. Arthur Perry and as Edwin Perry
June Collyer 	... 	June Houghland
Huntley Gordon	... 	Dr. Henry M. Scofield (billed as Huntly Gordon)
George Meeker  	... 	Richard Grayson
Henry Mowbray 	... 	Chief of Police Milton
Charles Hill Mailes  	... 	Prof. James Houghland
Claire McDowell	... 	Mrs. Houghland
Hattie McDaniel 	... 	Isabella - the Cook
Allen Jung	... 	Ah Ling - the Houseboy (billed as Allan Jung)
Charles K. French	... 	Donald M. Jordan

References

External links

 
 
 
 Murder by Television at Public Domain Torrents

1935 films
American black-and-white films
1935 mystery films
American mystery films
1930s English-language films
Films directed by Clifford Sanforth
1930s American films